The 1976 Westminster Titans football team was an American football team that represented Westminster College of Pennsylvania as an independent during the 1976 NAIA Division II football season. In their fifth season under head coach Joe Fusco, the Titans compiled a 10–1 record.

Schedule

Season overview

Homecoming vs. Grove City
On October 9, Westminster defeated , 27–0, in the Titans' homecoming game. It was Westminster's 25th consecutive homecoming victory. Quarterback Jan Budai ran 74 yards for a touchdown after the running back missed an assignment to take the handoff from Budai.

Frostburg
Westminster won its most one-sided game of the season on October 16, defeating Frostburg by a 55–7 score at Frostburg, Maryland. Westminster's defense gave up only four first downs, forced six fumbles and two interceptions, and held Frostburg to 14 passing yards and minus 16 rushing yards. Frostburg's sole touchdown came on an 88-yard kickoff return. Westminter out-gained Frostburg by 535 yards of total offense to minus two.

Allegheny
Sophomore Jeff Ribey returned a punt 88 yards for the game-winning touchdown in the fourth quarter. Rimbey was a backup safety and not the team's regular punt returner until an injury earlier in the season gave him the opportunity to play. The victory qualified the Titans for a berth in the NAIA Division II playoffs.

Semifinals at Texas Lutheran
Westminster  entered the playoffs with the top rushing defense in Division II, allowing only 57.7 points per game.

On November 20, Westminster upset the No. 1-ranked , winning by a 31–0 score on the road in Seguin, Texas. Texas Lutheran had won the Division II championship in both 1974 and 1975 and was the favorite to win again in 1976. Quarterback Jan Budai threw an 18-yard touchdown pass to Dave Hasson and ran one yard for another touchdown. Dave Armahizer also scored on an 85-yard interception return in the third quarter. On defense, the Titans held Texas Lutheran to 122 rushing yards and 139 passing yards.

Championship game at Redlands
On December 4, Westminster, ranked No. 2, played in the Division II national championship game, defeating No. 3 , 20–13, on the road in Redlands, California. Westminster quarterback Jan Budai threw a 44-yard touchdown pass to Dave Hasson. Redlands kicked two field goals, and the Titans led, 7–6, at halftime. In the third quarter, Westminster capitalized on a Redlands fumble recovered at the six-yard line. Mike Szuba scored on a one-yard run.  Redlands tied the game, 13–13, on a 29-yard touchdown pass from Steve Vento to Brian DeRoo. Redlands fumbled a punt, and Westminster recovered the ball at Redlands' 22-yard line. From there, the Titans advanced to the two-yard line, and Budai ran two yards for the game-winning touchdown with 6:56 remaining in the game.

References

Westminster
Westminster Titans football seasons
NAIA Football National Champions
Westminster Titans football